Tebaitahe (Sometimes spelt Tevaitahe) is a village in the Solomon Islands, on Rennell Island in the Rennell and Bellona province.

Location

Located at the end of the main road about 2 ¾ hr drive from Tigoa.  This village is located on the shore of Lake Te Nggano.
Travel easterly for 30 km from Tigoa until T-intersection just prior to Lavangu, turn left and travel for 18 km.

Population
200 people approx

Religion
South Sea Evangelical Church (SSEC)

Police
Generally policing is serviced by the Tigoa police station as well as a local Provincial government employed area Constable.

The Royal Solomon Island Police has a Banana boat located at this village. The Outboard motor is stored in the police station at Tigoa.

Populated places in Rennell and Bellona Province